Modern Life Is Rubbish is a 2017 British romantic comedy film directed by Daniel Jerome Gill and written by Philip Gawthorne, based on Gill's 2009 short film of the same name. The film stars Josh Whitehouse and Freya Mavor.

Cast 
 Josh Whitehouse as Liam
 Freya Mavor as Natalie 
 Will Merrick as Ollie
 Matt Milne as Gus
 Tom Riley as Adrian
 Daisy Bevan as Layla 
 Jessie Cave as Kerry 
 Sorcha Cusack as Mary
 Steven Mackintosh as Lenny 
 Ian Hart as The Curve

References

External links 

2017 films
Films about music and musicians
British romantic comedy films
2017 romantic comedy films
2010s musical comedy films
British musical comedy films
2017 directorial debut films
2010s English-language films
2010s British films